Shangus is a village Panchayat and a tehsil in Anantnag district of the Indian union territory of Jammu and Kashmir.

Demographics
The population of Shangus village was 5,235 according to the 2011 Indian census, while the population of the Shangus tehsil was 52,352. shangas is the biggest village interms of population in the district Anantnag.There are almost 29 Musjids and a big Grand Mosque called "Jamia Masjid Shangus" which is at present second big Musjid Shareef after the Jamia Masjid Srinagar. Locally the Shangas is divided into segments viz shangas A or HERGAM, Shangus- B  or bonagam and MANZGAM which includes khanpora, wanipora, muqdampora etc. and many other neighborhoods in the vicinity of EIDGAH including BADAMIBAGH which is located towards the neighbouring village Nowgam, Anantnag

Politics
Shangus is in the Shangus state assembly constituency and the Anantnag parliamentary constituency.

2005 bus accident tragedy
In September 2005, The bus carrying 86 passengers left Shangus in Anantnag district of south Kashmir on Thursday morning. Those on board were reportedly on way to Tatta Paani, water spring that attracts people from distant areas for curative reasons.

Minister of State for Home, A R Veeri told the House that the bus (JK03-3837) left Shangus-Anantnag and met with an accident at Chapri Nullah Ramban at 4.45 p.m on Thursday. He said the bus with 52 seats was carrying 86 passengers including 25 men, 47 women and 14 children. He said 35 passengers died on spot while seven succumbed to injuries at Ramban hospital. He said those who died included 27 women, 12 man and three children. Of the injured 19 have been evacuated to SKIMS, Soura, Srinagar, 12 are at district hospital, Anantnag and 11 at Ramban hospital.

Chief Minister Mufti Mohammad Sayeed expressed shock and grief over the loss of lives in the accident. Minister of state for Works, G A Mir and Minister of state for Agriculture, Aijaz Ahmad also expressed shock and grief over the accident. most of the passengers who died in the accident were from the Shangus area in Anantnag district. The ministers demanded relief for the next of kin of the deceased. Mr Mir has demanded a probe into the accident.

See also
Akingam
Anantnag
Achabal

References

Cities and towns in Anantnag district